Chaman Puri was an Indian actor of Hindi and Punjabi films. His younger brothers were Bollywood actors Madan Puri and Amrish Puri.

Early life
Chaman Lal Puri was the first of five children, with younger brothers Madan Puri, Amrish Puri and Harish Lal Puri and younger sister Chandrakanta Mehra. He was the first cousin of the singer K. L. Saigal.

Career
He is best known for Howrah Bridge (1958), The Train (1970) and Victoria No. 203 (1972).

Filmography

References

External links
 

Punjabi Hindus
Punjabi people
Indian male film actors
People from Shaheed Bhagat Singh Nagar district
20th-century Indian male actors
Male actors in Hindi cinema